Wilson High School may refer to:

In the United States:
Wilson Classical High School, Long Beach, California
Wilson High School (Alabama), a public K-12 school in Lauderdale County, Alabama
Wilson High School (Oklahoma), a public high school in Wilson, Oklahoma
Wilson High School (Pennsylvania), a public high school in West Lawn, Pennsylvania
Wilson High School (South Carolina), a public high school in Florence, South Carolina
Wilson High School (New York), a public high school in Wilson, New York
Glen A. Wilson High School, Hacienda Heights, California
Joseph C. Wilson Magnet High School, Rochester, New York

See also
Wilson School (disambiguation)
Woodrow Wilson High School (disambiguation)
Woodrow Wilson Junior High School (disambiguation)